Ruspidge Halt railway station is a disused railway station opened by the Great Western Railway (GWR) on the former Bullo Pill Railway, later known as the GWR Forest of Dean Branch.

History

The Halt was located about 4 miles 4 chains from Newnham on a 1 in 201 gradient.

The station opened for passenger services in August 1907. The low platform was constructed from stone and a stone building was provided from the outset.

Before the commencement of passenger services, the Forest of Dean Branch was worked by train staff in two sections - Bullo to Ruspidge and Ruspidge to Bilson. In order for the passenger services to be introduced, the former goods office was converted for use as a booking office (it had both the railway and public telephones).

The train staff working was also replaced by single line electric key token working and at this time a three-lever ground frame gave the porter control of the up and down distant signals and the gate bolts (which were interlocked).

Services

References

Further reading

Disused railway stations in Gloucestershire
Former Great Western Railway stations
Railway stations in Great Britain opened in 1907
Railway stations in Great Britain closed in 1958